This is a list of all tornadoes that were confirmed by local offices of the National Weather Service in the United States in March 2007.

United States Yearly Total

Note: January tornadoes were rated using the old Fujita scale, but are included in the chart above by matching the F rating to the related EF scale rating.

March

March 1 event

March 2 event

March 10 event

March 13 event

March 14 event

March 16 event

March 21 event

March 23 event

March 24 event

March 26 event

March 27 event

March 28 event

March 29 event

March 30 event

March 31 event

See also
Tornadoes of 2007
List of United States tornadoes from January to February 2007
List of United States tornadoes in April 2007

Notes

References

Tornadoes of 2007
2007, 03
March 2007 events in the United States